Hogback Mountain is the highest peak in the northern portion of Shenandoah National Park as well as the highest point in Warren County in northern Virginia, United States. A part of the Blue Ridge Mountains, it is located along the border of Warren and Rappahannock counties. It is easily accessible via Skyline Drive and the Appalachian Trail.

References

Mountains of Shenandoah National Park
Mountains of Warren County, Virginia
Mountains of Rappahannock County, Virginia